Francis Chansa (born September 10, 1974 in Lubumbashi) is a Congolese football goalkeeper who last played for Maritzburg United in South Africa. He also holds South African citizenship.

He was a member of the Congolese 2006 African Nations Cup team, who progressed to the quarter finals, where they were eliminated by Egypt, who eventually won the tournament.

Chansa is known for his acrobatic saves.

Chansa was the shot-stopper coach in Vera Pauw's technical team, which assisted Banyana Banyana in qualifying for the Africa Cup of Nations and the Olympic Games.

See also
List of people related to the Democratic Republic of the Congo

References

External links

1974 births
Living people
People from Lubumbashi
Democratic Republic of the Congo footballers
Democratic Republic of the Congo expatriate footballers
Democratic Republic of the Congo international footballers
Association football goalkeepers
Durban Bush Bucks players
Orlando Pirates F.C. players
Democratic Republic of the Congo expatriate sportspeople in South Africa
Lamontville Golden Arrows F.C. players
Bidvest Wits F.C. players
Mpumalanga Black Aces F.C. players
Maritzburg United F.C. players
21st-century Democratic Republic of the Congo people